The Weber Cup, named after bowling legend Dick Weber, is a men's ten-pin bowling competition between Team Europe and Team USA. The teams competing over three days in a series of singles, doubles and team (baker) matches.

The Weber Cup is equivalent to the Ryder Cup in golf and the Mosconi Cup in pool.

History and background
The Weber Cup is the annual Europe vs United States ten-pin bowling championships and is currently broadcast live from start to finish on Sky Sports in the UK and in many other international channels around the world. It usually takes place in October every year.

For the first seven events, from 2000 to 2006, 35 matches were played. Each match worth one point. The first team to 18 points won the tournament.
From 2007, the tournament was reduced slightly to 33 matches, again each match is worth 1 point so the first team to 17 will win.

All matches are played in a single lane arena, with banked spectators on both sides, which is specially constructed for the event.

2003
In 2003, missing their captain Tim Mack, and up against some vociferous northern support, Team USA were never in contention as the Europeans went into the lead early on day one and never relinquished it.

After three barren years of total United States domination, Team Europe finally overcame the odds in November 2003 to lift the hallowed Weber Cup for the first time. It was a total triumph for captain Tomas Leandersson, who led from the front for all three days, putting in a sterling performance that saw his side over the line.

2004
Following on from Europe's recent success in golf's Ryder Cup earlier in the year, it was the tenpin bowlers’ turn as they defeated their American counterparts in what was ultimately a one-sided battle at the Altrincham Leisure Centre.

The final score line of 18–11 was a fair reflection as Team Europe pulled away on the final day after the Americans kept them pinned back to a one-point lead at 11–10 after two days of play.

2005
In 2005, the Europeans staged a dramatic comeback after falling 14-16 behind. In front of a packed audience and live TV cameras, they won the first 4 singles games in the final session of play and took the title for the third successive year, 18–16. As in the previous year, Team Europe Captain, Tomas Leandersson won the decisive point with a win over Team USAs Tony Manna Jr.

2006
In the closest tournament to date, Team USA won on the final evening of the contest, by 18–17.

After the first days play, Team USA led 4-2 and Europe's Paul Moor bowled the first perfect game in the Weber Cup to start the competition against Jason Couch. The only other European win in the first session came from Tomas Leandersson against Chris Barnes. Tommy Jones defeated Mika Koivuniemi, Tim Mack beat Tore Torgersen, Bill Hoffman triumphed over Jens Nickel and the Baker system game was won by Team USA.

After day two Team USA led with what looked like an unassailable 12–6 lead. Europe took the final days first session 5–0 to get back into contention at 11–12, before leading 14-13 going into the final evening session.

Both teams were tied 17-17 going into the final decisive baker system game - at one point Team Europe led by over 30 pins, with Mack and Hoffman failing to strike. The game became close (11 pins) and then in the ninth frame Tore Torgersen left a difficult split and missed, giving Tommy Jones the opportunity to step up and seal the victory for the Americans, and he duly obliged.

2007
The 2007 Weber Cup, was again a close affair, with Team USA running out eventual winners 17–15, coming back from 14 to 10 before the start of the final session.

On day one, in the fifth match, Tommy Jones rolled the second ever perfect game in the tournament's history, against Team Europe captain Tomas Leandersson, and at close of play on day one, the scores were tied at 4 matches apiece.

Day two was a day for the Americans, who won the session 4–2 to take a 7–5 lead. Consolation for Team Europe came with the final Baker match, which they duly won. In the evening session, Team Europe fought back, to bring the scores back level at 9-9, again winning the final Baker match.

Team Europe started day three in blistering from, winning 5 of the 6 matches to take what looked like an unassailable 14–10 lead going into the final evening session, however Team USA had other ideas, and won seven of the eight games in the final session, with only Paul Moor for Team Europe winning his singles match against Team USA's captain Tim Mack.

This win extended Team USA's overall lead to 5–3 in the series.

2008
The 2008 Weber Cup took place once again at the Barnsley Metrodome, from 3 to 5 October 2008.

Both teams had familiar line-ups, which featured several Weber Cup veterans, including Tore Torgersen (Norway) for Team Europe, and Tim Mack for Team USA, who again captained his side.

Torgersen was joined by Paul Moor (England), who was playing in his fourth Weber Cup. Finland's Mika Koivuniemi and Osku Palermaa also returned, and making his debut in the competition was Dominic Barrett from England. Palermaa was given the captaincy for Team Europe for the first time, taking over from Sweden's Tomas Leandersson.

Team USA featured four stars of the PBA tour, with Chris Barnes, Tommy Jones and Jason Couch returning for more Weber Cup action. They were joined by Pete Weber, who made his first appearance in the tournament named after his late father, legendary PBA star Dick Weber. 
Team Europe (L-R)
 Dominic Barrett - Cambridge, England
 Tore Torgersen - Stavanger, Norway
 Paul Moor - Beverley, England
 Osku Palermaa - Espoo, Finland (Captain)
 Mika Koivuniemi - Tampere, Finland

Team USA (L-R)
 Tommy Jones - Simpsonville, South Carolina
 Chris Barnes - Flower Mound, Texas
 Jason Couch - Clermont, Florida
 Tim Mack - Garfield, New Jersey (Captain)
 Pete Weber - St. Ann, Missouri

Before the tournament, the overall score stood at 5–3 in favour of Team USA, so the Europeans were hoping for a win to prevent the gap extending further, however Team USA continued the trend of 3 consecutive wins, to make it 3 wins on the trot once more, just as they did in the first 3 tournaments. Team USA ultimately won 17–13, the largest margin of victory for 5 years. The winning point was won on the final baker team game.

The first session on Friday evening was shared, with both team winning three points each, and on the Saturday afternoon, Team Europe took the lead 7–5, before collapsing 5–1 in the evening session to trail 10-8 after the end of day two. Things did not improve for the Europeans on the Sunday, and they continued to trail 14-10 after the afternoon session. The final session started brightly for Team Europe, as they won the first two points, however a strong team effort from the Americans thwarted any comeback as they won three of the last four points, including the final baker team game, to claim victory once more.

2009
A close-fought contest between the two teams, with the debut of Martin Laarsen into the European team, team Europe started to pull away from the USA towards the end. Tommy Jones completed his hat-trick of 300 games with three in three years at the Weber Cup

2010
The Contest was full of drama with a baker game consisting of a European victory 156 - 154, one of the lowest scores in Weber Cup history. The teams were formed up of four players on each team meaning the dropping of Martin Larsen from Europe and Jason Couch for the USA. The tournament was won by the Europeans, captained once again by Osku Palermaa

Results table

Past events
2008 Weber Cup - Team USA Win, Barnsley Metrodome.
2007 Weber Cup - Team USA Win, Barnsley Metrodome.
2006 Weber Cup - Team USA Win, Barnsley Metrodome.
2005 Weber Cup  - Team Europe win, Barnsley Metrodome.
2004 Weber Cup  - Team Europe win, Altrincham Leisure Centre, Greater Manchester, England.
2003 Weber Cup - Team Europe win, Altrincham Leisure Centre, Greater Manchester, England.
2002 Weber Cup - Team USA win, Ponds Forge International Center, Sheffield, England.
2001 Weber Cup - Team USA win, Goresbrook Leisure Centre, Dagenham, England
2000 Weber Cup - Team USA win, Inaugural event in Warsaw, Poland.

External links
 Official website of the Weber Cup
 Pictures from the 2006 Weber Cup
 Report and reaction from the 2006 Weber Cup
https://web.archive.org/web/20060205054259/http://www.btba.org.uk:80/weber.htm 
 Calendar :: Bowlers Journal International
Bowlinglinks all over the World, sorted by categories

Ten-pin bowling competitions
Tenpin bowling in the United Kingdom